Typhoon Kirogi, known in the Philippines as Typhoon Ditang, was a large typhoon that caused severe damage in Japan during early July 2000. Forming out of an area of disturbed weather on June 30, Kirogi initially tracked slowly towards the north. On July 3, the storm underwent rapid intensification and attained Category 4 status on the Saffir–Simpson Hurricane Scale the next day, according to the JTWC. Over the following several days, the storm tracked towards the northeast and accelerated towards Japan. Early on July 8, Kirogi brushed eastern Japan before transitioning into an extratropical cyclone.

Initial news reports stated that Kirogi produced deadly flooding in the Philippines; however, the storm was too far from the country to have any impacts. In Japan, Kirogi produced torrential rainfall and high winds, killing five people and leaving 15 billion (2001 JPY, $140 million USD) in damages. Flooding inundated nearly 1,300 homes around Tokyo and high winds cut power to roughly 20,000 residences. Three homes were destroyed in a landslide on Kozushima.

Meteorological history

The system remained nearly stationary for two days as it became increasingly organized. On July 1, the Joint Typhoon Warning Center (JTWC) issued a Tropical Cyclone Formation Alert as they anticipated the low to develop into a significant tropical cyclone within 24 hours. Around 0600 UTC the following day, the Japan Meteorological Agency (JMA) began monitoring the system as a tropical depression. At the same time, the JTWC also classified the system as Tropical Depression 05W and six hours later, the Philippine Atmospheric, Geophysical and Astronomical Services Administration (PAGASA) began issuing advisories on the same system, classifying it as Tropical Depression Ditang.

Throughout the day on July 2, the depression began to take a slow northward track in response to a mid-level subtropical ridge to the east and later that day, the JTWC upgraded it to a tropical storm. Early the next day, the JMA also upgraded the system to a tropical storm, at which time it received the name Kirogi. Although a broad cyclone, convection was gradually wrapping around the southern periphery of the circulation. Several hours after being named, the JMA upgraded Kirogi to a severe tropical storm and later a typhoon. At the same time, the JTWC classified the storm as a typhoon. Upon being upgraded the typhoon featured a well-developed outflow and prominent banding features consolidating around the system.

Not long after attaining typhoon intensity, Kirogi began to undergo rapid intensification. Roughly 18 hours later, the JTWC reported that the storm had attained its peak intensity with winds of  1-minute sustained), equivalent to a Category 4 hurricane on the Saffir–Simpson Hurricane Scale.

Several hours after attaining peak intensity on July 5, a mid-level trough caused convection around the center of Kirogi to weaken and the eye became cloud-filled. Later in the day, most of the convective bands were confined to the eastern periphery of the system. Around this time, the storm took a northeasterly track, which it maintained for several days. Increasing in forward motion, the storm began to weaken; however, it also grew in size. Early on July 8, the storm brushed the eastern coast of Japan near Chōshi, Chiba with winds of  10-minute sustained). Several hours later, the typhoon weakened to a severe tropical storm before transitioning into an extratropical cyclone near the southeast coast of Hokkaido. By this time, the storm took a sharp eastward turn and briefly slowed before re-accelerating. The remnants of the storm persisted until July 10, at which time it dissipated to the southwest of the Aleutian Islands.

To measure wind speeds at the storm's center, the Japan Meteorological Agency and Joint Typhoon Warning Center use 10-minute sustained winds and one-minute sustained winds respectively. The conversion factor between 10-minute and one-minute winds is 1.14x. The JMA's peak intensity for Kirogi was  10-minute sustained, or  one-minute sustained. The JTWC's peak intensity for Kirogi was  one-minute sustained, or  10-minute sustained.

Preparations and impact

Philippines
In the typhoon's early stages, news reports stated that the outer bands of the storm produced heavy rainfall in the Philippines, resulting in 16 fatalities. However, a meteorological analysis of the storm showed that Kirogi was not responsible for the rain; instead, a monsoon depression that later became Typhoon Kai-tak caused the flooding rains. However, large swells produced by the storm caused moderate damage along coastal areas of the Philippines, forcing workers in Manila to clear debris left by the damaging waves.

Japan

In Japan, Kirogi became the first typhoon to threaten the city of Tokyo since a storm in the 1989 Pacific typhoon season, prompting hundreds of residents to evacuate. In Kozushima, 788 residents were evacuated as heavy rain from the typhoon produced landslides. In the city of Tokyo, Japanese officials ordered 800 residents to evacuate to shelters due to the threat of Typhoon Kirogi.

Since the storm weakened considerably from its peak intensity, damage was much less than initially anticipated. In all, damages from the storm amounted to 15 billion (2001 JPY, $140 million USD). Three people were killed by the storm, all of whom were found in irrigation ditches. The first fatality was an 81-year-old man, the second was a 30-year-old man who lost control of his car and crashed into a ditch, and the last fatality was a 3-year-old boy who fell in a ditch near his home. Two 11-year-old boys, initially reported as missing, were later found in a ditch after being swept away by flood waters.

About 1,300 homes were inundated by flood waters around Tokyo and three were destroyed on Kōzushima by a landslide. Widespread power outages took place, leaving an estimated 20,000 people without power in Kanagawa and Shizuoka prefectures as winds up to  knocked down trees and power lines. Rainfall from the storm fell at rates of 55 mm/h (2.2 in/h). These rains were more than double the monthly average for July in eastern Japan.

Rainfall up to  caused flooding throughout eastern Hokkaidō, resulting in widespread agricultural losses. Throughout Aomori Prefecture, large stretches of roads were washed out by flood waters and several thousand homes were inundated. Damage from the storm in Aomori was estimated at 600 million (2001 JPY, US$6.6 million). The fishing industry in Urakawa District, Hokkaidō sustained severe losses, amounting to 889 million (2001 JPY, US$10 million). High winds in the district resulted in moderate roof damage to several homes, some of which lost their roofs.

See also

Other tropical cyclones named Kirogi
2000 Pacific typhoon season
Typhoon Wipha (2013)

References

External links

JMA General Information of Typhoon Kirogi (0003) from Digital Typhoon
JMA Best Track Data (Graphics) of Typhoon Kirogi (0003)
JMA Best Track Data (Text)
JTWC Best Track Data  of Typhoon 05W (Kirogi)
05W.KIROGI from the U.S. Naval Research Laboratory

Typhoons in Japan
2000 Pacific typhoon season
Typhoons
2000 in Japan
2000 disasters in the Philippines
Typhoons in the Philippines
Kirogi